Graffias ("claws") is a traditional name for several stars in the constellations between Scorpius and Libra.

It can refer to:
 β Sco; later transferred from ξ Sco.
 ξ Sco (also 51 Lib); applied to Bayer's star list in his Uranometria.
 Burritt's ξ of Libra; applied to Burritt's star map.
 ζ Sco; applied to Becvar's star list, as Grafias.

See also 
 List of stars in Libra
 List of stars in Scorpius

References 
  
 
  
 

Libra (constellation)
Scorpius (constellation)
Stars with proper names